The 2021 UEFA Women's Under-19 Championship qualifying competition was a women's under-19 football competition that was to determine the seven teams joining the automatically qualified hosts Belarus in the 2021 UEFA Women's Under-19 Championship final tournament. Players born on or after 1 January 2002 were eligible to participate.

Apart from Belarus, 49 of the remaining 54 UEFA member national teams entered the qualifying competition, with Andorra making their debut, where the original format consisted of two rounds: Qualifying round, which would have taken place in autumn 2020, and Elite round, which would also have taken place in spring 2021. However, due to the COVID-19 pandemic in Europe, UEFA announced on 13 August 2020 that after consultation with the 55 member associations, the qualifying round was delayed to February 2021, and the elite round was abolished and replaced by play-offs, contested in April 2021 by the 12 qualifying round group winners, the best runners-up, and the top seed by coefficient ranking, Spain (which originally received a bye to the elite round), to determine the teams qualifying for the final tournament.

On 23 February 2021, the UEFA Executive Committee announced the cancellation of the 2021 championship due to the ongoing COVID-19 pandemic after consulting all member associations.

Format
The qualifying competition originally consisted of the following two rounds:
Qualifying round: Apart from Spain, which received a bye to the elite round as the team with the highest seeding coefficient, the remaining 48 teams were drawn into 12 groups of four teams. Each group was to be played in single round-robin format at one of the teams selected as hosts after the draw. The 12 group winners, the 12 runners-up, and the three third-placed teams with the best record against the first and second-placed teams in their group were to advance to the elite round.
Elite round: The 28 teams were drawn into seven groups of four teams. Each group was to be played in single round-robin format at one of the teams selected as hosts after the draw. The seven group winners were to qualify for the final tournament.

After the format change, the qualifying competition consisted of the following two rounds:
Qualifying round: The draw remained the same as before. The 12 group winners, the runners-up with the best record against the first and third-placed teams in their group, and Spain, which originally received a bye to the elite round, were to advance to the play-offs.
Play-offs: The 14 teams were to be drawn into seven ties. The seven winners were to qualify for the final tournament.

Qualifying round

Draw
The draw for the qualifying round was held on 29 November 2019, 10:00 CET (UTC+1), at the UEFA headquarters in Nyon, Switzerland.

The teams were seeded according to their coefficient ranking, calculated based on the following:
2016 UEFA Women's Under-19 Championship final tournament and qualifying competition (qualifying round and elite round)
2017 UEFA Women's Under-19 Championship final tournament and qualifying competition (qualifying round and elite round)
2018 UEFA Women's Under-19 Championship final tournament and qualifying competition (qualifying round and elite round)
2019 UEFA Women's Under-19 Championship final tournament and qualifying competition (qualifying round and elite round)

Each group contained one team from Pot A, one team from Pot B, one team from Pot C, and one team from Pot D. Based on the decisions taken by the UEFA Emergency Panel, the following pairs of teams could not be drawn in the same group: Russia and Ukraine, Russia and Kosovo, Serbia and Kosovo, Bosnia and Herzegovina and Kosovo, Azerbaijan and Armenia.

Notes
Teams marked in bold have qualified for the final tournament.

Groups
The qualifying round was originally scheduled to be played during one of the two FIFA women's international windows, either 14–22 September or 19–27 October 2020, but all groups were later rescheduled to the window of 23 November – 1 December. However, due to the COVID-19 pandemic in Europe, UEFA announced on 13 August 2020 that after consultation with the 55 member associations, the qualifying round was delayed to February 2021<ref name="UEFA20200813"/ before its cancellation.

Times are CET (UTC+1), as listed by UEFA (local times, if different, are in parentheses).

Group 1
Originally scheduled to be played between 21–27 October, later rescheduled to 25 November – 1 December 2020.

Group 2
Originally scheduled to be played between 20–26 October, later rescheduled to 24 November – 1 December 2020.

Group 3
Originally scheduled to be played between 21–27 October, later rescheduled to 25 November – 1 December 2020.

Group 4
Originally scheduled to be played between 21–27 October, later rescheduled to 25 November – 1 December 2020.

Group 5
Originally scheduled to be played between 21–27 October, later rescheduled to 25 November – 1 December 2020.

Group 6
Originally scheduled to be played between 21–27 October, later rescheduled to 25 November – 1 December 2020.

Group 7
Originally scheduled to be played between 21–27 October, later rescheduled to 25 November – 1 December 2020.

Group 8
Originally scheduled to be played between 21–27 October, later rescheduled to 25 November – 1 December 2020.

Group 9
Originally scheduled to be played between 21–27 October, later rescheduled to 25 November – 1 December 2020.

Group 10
Originally scheduled to be played between 21–27 October, later rescheduled to 25 November – 1 December 2020.

Group 11
Originally scheduled to be played between 21–27 October, later rescheduled to 25 November – 1 December 2020.

Group 12
Originally scheduled to be played between 21–27 October, later rescheduled to 25 November – 1 December 2020.

Ranking of second-placed teams
To determine the best second-placed team from the qualifying round which advances to the play-offs, only the results of the second-placed teams against the first and third-placed teams in their group are taken into account.

Elite round
The draw for the elite round would originally be held on 8 December 2020 at the UEFA headquarters in Nyon, Switzerland, and the matches were originally scheduled to be played in spring 2021. However, due to the COVID-19 pandemic in Europe, UEFA announced on 13 August 2020 that after consultation with the 55 member associations, the elite round was abolished and replaced by play-offs.<ref name="UEFA20200813"/

Play-offs
The 14 teams were to be drawn into seven ties. The seven winners were to qualify for the final tournament. The play-offs were scheduled to be played in April 2021.<ref name="UEFA20200813"/
Qualified teams

Group 1 winner
Group 2 winner
Group 3 winner
Group 4 winner
Group 5 winner
Group 6 winner
Group 7 winner
Group 8 winner
Group 9 winner
Group 10 winner
Group 11 winner
Group 12 winner
Best runner-up

Times are CEST (UTC+2), as listed by UEFA (local times, if different, are in parentheses).

Qualified teams
The following eight teams were to qualify for the final tournament.

1 Bold indicates champions for that year. Italic indicates hosts for that year.

References

External links

Women's Under-19 Matches: 2021 Qualifying, UEFA.com

Qualification
2021
2020 in women's association football
2021 in women's association football
2020 in youth association football
2021 in youth association football
February 2021 sports events in Europe
April 2021 sports events in Europe
Association football events cancelled due to the COVID-19 pandemic